The 2015 Spanish general election was held on Sunday, 20 December 2015, to elect the 11th Cortes Generales of the Kingdom of Spain. All 350 seats in the Congress of Deputies were up for election, as well as 208 of 266 seats in the Senate. At exactly four years and one month since the previous general election, this remains the longest timespan between two general elections since the Spanish transition to democracy, and the only time in Spain a general election has been held on the latest possible date allowed under law.

After a legislature plagued by the effects of an ongoing economic crisis, corruption scandals affecting the ruling party and social distrust with traditional parties, the election resulted in the most fragmented Spanish parliament in its history. While the People's Party (PP) of incumbent prime minister Mariano Rajoy emerged as the largest party overall, it obtained its worst result since 1989. The party's net loss of 64 seats and 16 percentage points also marked the largest loss of support for a sitting government since 1982. The opposition Spanish Socialist Workers' Party (PSOE) obtained its worst result since the Spanish transition to democracy, losing 20 seats and nearly 7 points. Newcomer Podemos (Spanish for "We can") ranked third, winning over 5 million votes, some 20% of the share, 69 seats and coming closely behind PSOE. Up-and-coming Citizens (C's), a party based in Catalonia since 2006, entered the parliament for the first time with 40 seats, though considerably lower than what pre-election polls had suggested.

Smaller parties were decimated, with historic United Left (IU)—which ran in a common platform with other left-wing parties under the Popular Unity umbrella—obtaining the worst result in its history. Union, Progress and Democracy (UPyD), a newcomer which had made gains in both the 2008 and 2011 general elections, was obliterated, losing all of its seats and nearly 90% of its votes. At the regional level, aside from a major breakthrough from Republican Left of Catalonia (ERC), the election saw all regional nationalist parties losing votes; the break up of Convergence and Union (CiU), support for the abertzale left EH Bildu coalition falling sharply, Canarian Coalition (CC) clinging on to a single seat and the expulsion of both Geroa Bai and the Galician Nationalist Bloc (BNG) from parliament; the latter of which had maintained an uninterrupted presence in the Congress of Deputies since 1996.

With the most-voted party obtaining just 123 seats—compared to the 156 of the previous worst result for a first party, in 1996—and a third party winning an unprecedented 69 seats—the previous record was 23 in 1979—the result marked the transition from a two-party system to a multi-party system. After months of inconclusive negotiations and a failed investiture, neither PP or PSOE were able to garner enough votes to secure a majority, leading to a fresh election in 2016.

Overview

Electoral system
The Spanish Cortes Generales were envisaged as an imperfect bicameral system. The Congress of Deputies had greater legislative power than the Senate, having the ability to vote confidence in or withdraw it from a prime minister and to override Senate vetoes by an absolute majority of votes. Nonetheless, the Senate possessed a few exclusive (yet limited in number) functions—such as its role in constitutional amendment—which were not subject to the Congress' override. Voting for the Cortes Generales was on the basis of universal suffrage, which comprised all nationals over 18 years of age and in full enjoyment of their political rights. Additionally, Spaniards abroad were required to apply for voting before being permitted to vote, a system known as "begged" or expat vote.

For the Congress of Deputies, 348 seats were elected using the D'Hondt method and a closed list proportional representation, with an electoral threshold of three percent of valid votes—which included blank ballots—being applied in each constituency. Seats were allocated to constituencies, corresponding to the provinces of Spain, with each being allocated an initial minimum of two seats and the remaining 248 being distributed in proportion to their populations. Ceuta and Melilla were allocated the two remaining seats, which were elected using plurality voting. The use of the D'Hondt method might result in a higher effective threshold, depending on the district magnitude.

As a result of the aforementioned allocation, each Congress multi-member constituency was entitled the following seats:

For the Senate, 208 seats were elected using an open list partial block voting system, with electors voting for individual candidates instead of parties. In constituencies electing four seats, electors could vote for up to three candidates; in those with two or three seats, for up to two candidates; and for one candidate in single-member districts. Each of the 47 peninsular provinces was allocated four seats, whereas for insular provinces, such as the Balearic and Canary Islands, districts were the islands themselves, with the larger—Majorca, Gran Canaria and Tenerife—being allocated three seats each, and the smaller—Menorca, Ibiza–Formentera, Fuerteventura, La Gomera, El Hierro, Lanzarote and La Palma—one each. Ceuta and Melilla elected two seats each. Additionally, autonomous communities could appoint at least one senator each and were entitled to one additional senator per each million inhabitants.

Election date
The term of each chamber of the Cortes Generales—the Congress and the Senate—expired four years from the date of their previous election, unless they were dissolved earlier. The election decree was required to be issued no later than the twenty-fifth day prior to the date of expiry of the Cortes in the event that the prime minister did not make use of his prerogative of early dissolution. The decree was to be published on the following day in the Official State Gazette (BOE), with election day taking place on the fifty-fourth day from publication. The previous election was held on 20 November 2011, which meant that the legislature's term would expire on 20 November 2015. The election decree was required to be published in the BOE no later than 27 October 2015, with the election taking place on the fifty-fourth day from publication, setting the latest possible election date for the Cortes Generales on Sunday, 20 December 2015.

The prime minister had the prerogative to dissolve both chambers at any given time—either jointly or separately—and call a snap election, provided that no motion of no confidence was in process, no state of emergency was in force and that dissolution did not occur before one year had elapsed since the previous one. Additionally, both chambers were to be dissolved and a new election called if an investiture process failed to elect a prime minister within a two-month period from the first ballot. Barred this exception, there was no constitutional requirement for simultaneous elections for the Congress and the Senate. Still, as of  there has been no precedent of separate elections taking place under the 1978 Constitution.

In May 2014, the Spanish newspaper ABC disclosed that the government was considering whether it was possible for a general election to be upheld until early 2016, supported on an ambiguous legal interpretation on the date of expiry of the Cortes Generales. In September 2014, the Spanish media Voz Pópuli and El Plural further inquired on the possibility that the PP cabinet would be planning to delay the legislature's expiry by as much as possible, not holding a new election until February 2016. However, legal reports commissioned by the government showed that the deadline for dissolving the Cortes and to call for a general election would be 26 October 2015, meaning that, with the election decree being published on the following day, an election could be held no later than 20 December. An opinion article published in Público on 8 December 2014 suggested then that the probable date for the election would then be either on 25 October or on a Sunday in November 2015, not counting All Saints' Day.

After the 2015 local and regional elections, it was suggested that the general election would presumably be held on either 22 or 29 November. However, once it was confirmed that the government intended for the approval of the 2016 budget before the election, it was strongly implied that polling day would have to be delayed until December to allow for completion of the budgetary parliamentary procedure, with either 13 or 20 December being regarded as the only legally possible dates for an election to be held. Finally, during an interview on 1 October, Rajoy announced that the election would be held on 20 December, the latest possible date allowed under Spanish law. Being held 4 years and 1 month after the 2011 election, this was the longest time-span between two general elections since the Spanish transition to democracy.

Background
Mariano Rajoy won the 2011 general election in a landslide running on a platform that promised to bring a solution to the country's worsening economic situation, marked by soaring unemployment and an out-of-control public deficit. However, shortly after taking office, Rajoy's People's Party (PP) popularity in opinion polls began to erode after its U-turn on economic policy, which included the breaching of many election pledges.

In its first months in power, Rajoy's government approved a series of tax rises, a harsh labour reform that allegedly cheapened dismissals—and which was met with widespread protests and two general strikes in March and November 2012—and an austere state budget for 2012. The crash of Bankia, one of the largest banks of Spain, in May 2012 resulted in a dramatic rise of the Spanish risk premium, and in June the country's banking system needed a bailout from the IMF. A major spending cut of €65 billion followed in July 2012, including a VAT rise from 18% to 21% which the PP itself had opposed during its time in opposition after the previous Socialist government had already raised VAT to 18%. Additional spending cuts and legal reforms followed throughout 2012 and 2013, including cuts in budget credit lines for the health care and education systems, the implementation of a pharmaceutical copayment, a reform of the pension system which stopped guaranteeing the increase of pensioners' purchasing power accordingly to the consumer price index, the suppression of the bonus for public employees, or the withdrawal of public subsidies to the dependent people care system. Other measures, such as a fiscal amnesty in 2012 allowing tax evaders to regularize their situation by paying a 10% tax—later reduced to 3%—and no criminal penalty, had been previously rejected by the PP during its time in opposition. Most of these measures were not included in the PP 2011 election manifesto and, inversely, many of the pledges included within were not fulfilled. Rajoy argued that "reality" prevented him from fulfilling his programme and that he had been forced to adapt to the new economic situation he found upon his accession to government.

In the domestic field, the 2011–2015 period was dominated by a perceived regression in social and political rights. Spending cuts on the health care and education systems had fueled an increase in inequality among those without enough financial resources to afford those services. The government's authorization of the enforcement and increase of court fees, requiring the payment of between €50 and €750 to appeal to the courts, was dubbed as violating the rights of effective judicial protection and free legal assistance. The controversial fees would later be removed in early 2015. A new Education Law—the LOMCE—received heavy criticism from the Basque and Catalan regional governments, which dubbed it as a re-centralizer bill, as well as from social sectors which considered that it prompted segregation in primary schools. Another bill, the Citizen Security Law and dubbed the "gag law" by critics, was met with a global outcry because of it being seen as a cracking down on Spaniards' rights of freedom of assembly and expression, laying out strict guidelines on demonstrations—perceived to limit street protests—and steep fines to offenders. Through 2013 to 2014, an attempt to amend the existing abortion law by a much stricter regulation allowing abortion only in cases of rape and of health risk to the mother was thwarted due to public outrage and widespread criticism both from within and outside the PP itself, resulting in its proponent, Justice Minister Alberto Ruiz-Gallardón, tendering his resignation.

Political corruption became one of the focus issues for Spaniards in the polls after the Bárcenas affair erupted in early 2013, amid revelations that former PP treasurer Luis Bárcenas had used a slush fund to pay out monthly amounts to leading members of the party, with further scandals rocking the PP for the remainder of its tenure. By late 2014, the sudden emergence of several episodes of corruption that had taken place over the previous years was compared to the Italian Tangentopoli in the 1990s. Among these were a massive expenses scandal involving former Caja Madrid senior executives and advisers—including members from the PP, PSOE and IU parties and from Spain's main trade unions, UGT and CCOO—, who were accused of using undeclared "black" credit cards for private expenditures; revelations that the PP could have spent as much as €1.7 million of undeclared money on works on its national headquarters in Madrid between 2006 and 2008; and the Punica case, a major scandal of public work contract kickbacks amounting at least €250 million and involving notable municipal and regional figures from both PSOE and PP, as well as a large number of politicians, councilors, officials and businessmen in the regions of Madrid, Murcia, Castile and León and Valencia. Ongoing investigations on the Gürtel scandal on the illegal financing of both the Madrilenian and Valencian branches of the People's Party brought down Health Minister Ana Mato, who was suspect from having benefited of some of the crimes allegedly committed by her former wife Jesús Sepúlveda, charged in the Gürtel case.

The Monarchy had also come under public scrutiny as a result of a corruption scandal affecting Duke of Palma Iñaki Urdangarín, the Nóos case, and his spouse Cristina de Borbón, Infanta of Spain and daughter of King Juan Carlos I, for possible crimes of tax fraud and money laundering. These corruption allegations, coupled with other scandals—such as public anger at King Juan Carlos' elephant hunting trip to Botswana at the height of the economic crisis in 2012—as well as his own health problems, had severely eroded the Spanish Royal Family's popularity among Spaniards, and were said to have taken its toll on the monarch, who announced his abdication on his son Felipe—to become Felipe VI of Spain—in June 2014.

The social response to the ongoing political and economic crisis was mixed. The 15-M Movement had resulted in an increase of street protests and demonstrations calling for a more democratic governmental system, a halt to spending cuts and tax increases and an overall rejection of Spain's two-party system formed by both PP and PSOE. Social mobilization channeled through various protest actions, such as "Surround the Congress" (Spanish for Rodea el Congreso), the so-called "Citizen Tides" (Mareas Ciudadanas) or the "Marches for Dignity" (Marchas de la Dignidad). In Catalonia, the PP's rise to power and its perceived rightist stance were said to have been the final trigger for the independence movement to fire up. A 1.5-million strong demonstration in Barcelona on 11 September 2012 finally convinced the regional ruling Convergence and Union (CiU) of Artur Mas to switch to independence support, with a snap election being held in November 2012 resulting in a huge rise for pro-independence ERC and the CUP and a meltdown for Socialist support in the region. Finally, the PP decline and the PSOE inability to recover lost support paved the way for the rise of new parties in the national landscape, such as Podemos and Citizens (C's), which began to rise dramatically in opinion polls after 2014 European Parliament election. PSOE leader Alfredo Pérez Rubalcaba resigned the day after the European election, being succeeded by Pedro Sánchez after a party leadership election in July 2014.

Parliamentary composition
The Cortes Generales were officially dissolved on 27 October 2015, after the publication of the dissolution decree in the Official State Gazette. The tables below show the composition of the parliamentary groups in both chambers at the time of dissolution.

Parties and candidates
The electoral law allowed for parties and federations registered in the interior ministry, coalitions and groupings of electors to present lists of candidates. Parties and federations intending to form a coalition ahead of an election were required to inform the relevant Electoral Commission within ten days of the election call, whereas groupings of electors needed to secure the signature of at least one percent of the electorate in the constituencies for which they sought election, disallowing electors from signing for more than one list of candidates. Concurrently, parties, federations or coalitions that had not obtained a mandate in either chamber of the Cortes at the preceding election were required to secure the signature of at least 0.1 percent of electors in the aforementioned constituencies.

Below is a list of the main parties and electoral alliances which contested the election:

The People's Party (PP) chose to continue its electoral alliance with the Aragonese Party (PAR) under which it had already won the general election in Aragon in 2011. In Asturias, an alliance with Asturias Forum (FAC)—former PP member Francisco Álvarez Cascos's party—was reached. Hastened by FAC's vote collapsing in the 2015 Asturian regional election, this was the first time both parties contested an election together since Cascos's party split in 2011. An agreement with Navarrese People's Union (UPN) was also reached, after a period of negotiations in which the regional party had considered to contest the general election on its own in Navarre. For the Senate, the PP also aligned itself with the Fuerteventura Municipal Assemblies (AMF) to contest the election in the Senate district of Fuerteventura.

Meanwhile, the Spanish Socialist Workers' Party (PSOE) and New Canaries (NCa) both announced they would contest the general election together in the Canary Islands. NCa had already contested the 2008 and 2011 elections before: in 2008 they stood alone and won no seats, while in 2011 they won 1 seat as a result of an alliance with Canarian Coalition (CCa), alliance which they chose not to continue in 2015. Extremaduran Coalition and United Extremadura broke up their coalitions with both PSOE and PP, respectively, and chose to contest the general together under a single joint list, Extremeños (Spanish for "Extremadurans").

In order to contest the general election, Podemos set up an extensive alliance system in several autonomous communities with other parties. After the negative results of the Catalunya Sí que es Pot alliance in the September Catalan election, Podemos, Initiative for Catalonia Greens (ICV) and United and Alternative Left (EUiA) reached an agreement with Barcelona en Comú—Barcelona Mayor Ada Colau's party—to form a joint list to contest the general election in Catalonia: En Comú Podem (Catalan for In Common We Can). The coalition was aimed at mirroring Colau's success in the 2015 Barcelona City Council election at Catalan level; if successful, it was planned to be maintained permanently for future electoral contests. In Galicia, Podemos, Anova and United Left (EU) merged into the En Marea ticket (Galician for In Tide). Such a coalition, which represented a qualitative leap from the Galician Left Alternative (AGE) coalition in the 2012 Galician regional election, was aimed at channeling the results of the local "mareas" ("tides") that succeeded throughout Galicia's largest cities in the May local elections. The coalition also received support from those local alliances, such as Marea Atlántica, Compostela Aberta or Ferrol en Común.

For the Valencian Community, the És el moment alliance (Valencian for It is Time) was created as a result of the agreement between Podemos and Compromís, with a strong role from Valencian deputy premier Mònica Oltra. United Left of the Valencian Country (EUPV) had also entered talks to enter the alliance, but left after disagreements with both Podemos and Compromís during negotiations. Additionally, Podemos was to contest the general election in the province of Huesca alongside segments of Now in Common within the "Ahora Alto Aragón en Común" coalition (Spanish for Now Upper Aragon in Common). In Navarre, all four Podemos, Geroa Bai, EH Bildu and I-E coalesced under the Cambio-Aldaketa umbrella for the Senate, aiming at disputing first place regionally to the UPN–PP alliance. The agreement was not extended to the Congress election, where all four parties ran separately.

In Catalonia and Galicia, Popular Unity (IU–UPeC) did not contest the election as such. The respective regional United Left branches joined En Marea and En Comú Podem, which supported Podemos at the national level. While a nationwide coalition between Podemos and IU had been considered, Podemos did not wish to assume IU's internal issues, and United Left candidate Alberto Garzón had refused to leave IU to integrate Podemos' lists. On the other hand, environmentalist party Equo was successful at reaching an agreement with Podemos, accepting to renounce their label and integrating themselves within Podemos' lists.

After the dissolution of the Convergence and Union (CiU) federation in Catalonia, Democratic Convergence of Catalonia (CDC) joined Democrats of Catalonia and Reagrupament within the Democracy and Freedom alliance after the failure of talks with Republican Left of Catalonia to continue the Junts pel Sí coalition for the general election. CDC's former ally, Josep Antoni Duran i Lleida's Democratic Union of Catalonia (UDC), chose to contest the election alone despite losing its parliamentary presence in the Parliament of Catalonia after the 2015 regional election.

Timetable
The key dates are listed below (all times are CET. Note that the Canary Islands use WET (UTC+0) instead):

26 October: The election decree is issued with the countersign of the Prime Minister after deliberation in the Council of Ministers, ratified by the King.
27 October: Formal dissolution of the Cortes Generales and official start of ban period for the organization of events for the inauguration of public works, services or projects.
30 October: Initial constitution of provincial and zone electoral commissions.
6 November: Deadline for parties and federations intending to enter in coalition to inform the relevant electoral commission.
16 November: Deadline for parties, federations, coalitions and groupings of electors to present lists of candidates to the relevant electoral commission.
18 November: Submitted lists of candidates are provisionally published in the Official State Gazette (BOE).
21 November: Deadline for citizens entered in the Register of Absent Electors Residing Abroad (CERA) and for citizens temporarily absent from Spain to apply for voting.
22 November: Deadline for parties, federations, coalitions and groupings of electors to rectify irregularities in their lists.
23 November: Official proclamation of valid submitted lists of candidates.
24 November: Proclaimed lists are published in the BOE.
4 December: Official start of electoral campaigning.
10 December: Deadline to apply for postal voting.
15 December: Official start of legal ban on electoral opinion polling publication, dissemination or reproduction and deadline for CERA citizens to vote by mail.
16 December: Deadline for postal and temporarily absent voters to issue their votes.
18 December: Last day of official electoral campaigning and deadline for CERA citizens to vote in a ballot box in the relevant consular office or division.
19 December: Official 24-hour ban on political campaigning prior to the general election (reflection day).
20 December: Polling day (polling stations open at 9 am and close at 8 pm or once voters present in a queue at/outside the polling station at 8 pm have cast their vote). Counting of votes starts immediately.
23 December: General counting of votes, including the counting of CERA votes.
26 December: Deadline for the general counting of votes to be carried out by the relevant electoral commission.
4 January: Deadline for elected members to be proclaimed by the relevant electoral commission.
14 January: Deadline for both chambers of the Cortes Generales to be re-assembled (the election decree determines this date, which for the 2015 election was set for 13 January).
13 February: Maximum deadline for definitive results to be published in the BOE.

Campaign

Party slogans

Election debates
A total of four debates involving the leaders of at least two of the four parties topping opinion polls (PP, PSOE, Podemos and C's) were held throughout the pre-campaign and campaign periods.

The first debate was organized by the Demos Association and held in the Charles III University of Madrid on 27 November. The leaders of the four main parties were invited, but in the end only Pablo Iglesias and Albert Rivera attended. The debate was broadcast live on YouTube.

The second debate was held on 30 November. Organized by El País newspaper, it was broadcast live entirely through the websites of El País and Cinco Días, the Cadena SER radio station and on the 13 TV television channel. Pedro Sánchez, as well as Iglesias and Rivera, attended the debate. Mariano Rajoy (PP) was also invited to the debate but declined the offer. According to the organizer, PP proposed the presence of Deputy PM Soraya Sáenz de Santamaría instead but it was refused, as she "was not the PP candidate for PM". A poll conducted online immediately after the debate by El País to its readers showed Iglesias winning with 47.0%, followed by Rivera with 28.9% and Sánchez with 24.1%.

A third, televised debate was organized by Atresmedia, held on 7 December and broadcast live simultaneously on its Antena 3 and laSexta TV channels and on the Onda Cero radio station. Rajoy had also been invited to the debate, but the PP announced that Soraya Sáenz de Santamaría would attend in his place instead. The audience for the debate averaged 9.2 million, peaking at more than 10 million. Online polls conducted immediately after the debate by major newspapers coincided in showing Iglesias winning, while political pundits and journalists pointed on his strong performance.

A fourth, final debate, organized  by the TV Academy, was held on 14 December. The signal of the debate was offered to all interested media. Among others, nationwide TV channels La 1, Canal 24 Horas, Antena 3, laSexta and 13 TV broadcast the debate live. Iglesias and Rivera were not invited to the debate, with only Rajoy and Sánchez participating. The audience for the debate averaged 9.7 million. A poll conducted by Atresmedia immediately after the debate showed 34.5% saying that "None of them" won, followed by Sánchez with 33.7%, Rajoy with 28.8% and "Both" with 3.0%.

Opinion polls

Development
Opinion polls heading into the campaign had shown the PP firmly in first position, with both PSOE and C's tied for second place and Podemos trailing in fourth. However, as the campaign started and election day neared, Podemos numbers had begun to rebound while C's slipped. Podemos centered its campaign around the slogan of "remontada" (Spanish for "comeback"), trying to convey voters a message of illusion and optimism. After the Atresmedia televised debate on 7 December—in which Iglesias was said to have outperformed all other three with his final address—and following a series of gaffes by C's leaders that had affected their party's campaign, Podemos experienced a surge in opinion polls. By Monday 14 December it had reached a statistical tie with C's, and kept growing and approaching the PSOE, vying for second place, in the polls conducted—but unpublished by Spanish media—after the legal ban on opinion polls during the last week of campaigning had entered into force. On 18 December, the final day of campaigning, Podemos staged a massive rally in la Fonteta arena in Valencia, in support of the Compromís–Podemos–És el moment coalition and as the closing point of their campaign. With a capacity of over 9,000 people, 2,000 were left outside as the interior was entirely filled. It was noted by some media as a remarkable feat, as the PSOE had been unable to entirely fill the same place just a few days earlier on 13 December.

The most notable incident during the electoral campaign was an attack on Mariano Rajoy during a campaign event in Pontevedra on 16 December. At 18:50, while walking with Development Minister Ana Pastor in the vicinity of the Pilgrim Church, a 17-year-old approached him and punched him in the temple. The assailant was restrained by the Prime Minister's security guards and was subsequently transferred to the police station in the city. Rajoy, who was red-faced and stunned for a few seconds, continued to walk without his glasses, broken during the assault. The assailant turned out to be related to Rajoy's wife, as he was the son of a cousin of Elvira Fernández, and also a member of a family known for sympathizing with the People's Party.

The following day, Rajoy attended a European Council meeting in Brussels, where Angela Merkel and other European leaders approached him showing their support to him after the assault. During the meeting a camera recorded Rajoy, Merkel and other leaders discussing the electoral prospects of Spanish parties. Rajoy revealed to them that, according to PP internal opinion polls, Podemos was rising quickly and approaching the PSOE, to the point that there was the possibility of it becoming the second political force of the country. Merkel expressed concern about such an event.

Opinion polls

Results

Congress of Deputies

Senate

Aftermath

Outcome
The election results produced the most fragmented parliament in recent Spanish history. As opinion polls had predicted, the People's Party (PP) was able to secure first place with a clear lead over its rivals, but it lost the absolute majority it had held since 2011 in the Congress of Deputies. Its 123 seat-count was the worst result ever obtained by a winning party in a Spanish general election—previously been 156 seats in 1996. Its result was also slightly below the party's expected goal of reaching 30% of the vote. The party's net loss of seats (64 fewer than in 2011) and vote share drop (minus 16 percentage points) was the PP's largest fall in popular support in its history, as well as the worst showing for a sitting government in Spain since 1982. Overall, it was also the worst result obtained by the PP in a general election since 1989, back to the party's refoundation from the People's Alliance.

The Spanish Socialist Workers' Party (PSOE) obtained its worst election result in recent history, with just 22% of the total party vote and 90 seats, well below Pedro Sánchez's target of at least 100 seats. Losing 20 seats and nearly 7 percentage points to its already negative 2011 result, this was the first time since the Spanish transition to democracy that one of the two largest parties fell below the 100-seat mark. Overall, while able to hold on to its second place nationally in terms of votes and seats, it lost the second and first place to Podemos in 8 out of the 17 autonomous communities, and finished fourth in Madrid, the capital's district. It was able to narrowly win in Andalusia and Extremadura—which it had resoundingly lost to the PP in 2011—thanks to the PP vote collapse in those regions, but it lost in Barcelona for the first time ever in a general election, and its sister party, the Socialists' Party of Catalonia (PSC), was reduced to third party status in Catalonia after decades of political dominance.

The combined results for the top two parties was also the worst for any general election held since 1977, gathering just 51% of the total party vote and 213 seats, just slightly above the required 3/5 majority for an ordinary constitutional reform. The result was regarded as a loss for bipartisanship in Spain as a whole, as the era of bipartisan politics was declared officially over by newcomers Podemos and Citizens, as well as by both national and international media.

Podemos, which contested a general election for the first time after having been founded in January 2014, obtained an unprecedented 21% of the vote and 69 seats together with its regional alliances, the best result ever obtained by a third party in a Spanish election. Coming short by 340,000 votes of securing its campaign goal of becoming the main left-wing party in Spain, it managed to secure second place in 6 out of the 17 autonomous communities and came top in another two—the Basque Country and Catalonia. This result was ahead of what initial pre-campaign and campaign opinion polls had predicted, and was in line with a late-campaign surge in support for the party. Citizens (C's) also had a strong performance for a national party in Spain, but its fourth place, 14% of the share and 40 seats were considered a letdown for party leader Albert Rivera, mainly as a consequence of the high expectations that had been generated around his candidacy. Pre-election opinion polls had placed C's near or above 20% of the vote share, and many also suggested a strong possibility of C's disputing second place to PSOE. Finally, it only came ahead of either PSOE or PP in Madrid and Catalonia. The party also found itself in a weaker political position than predicted, as the "kingmaker" position that was thought to go to C's under opinion polling projections finally went to PSOE, with the Congress' fragmentation resulting from the election meaning that neither the PP–C's nor the PSOE–Podemos–IU blocs would be able to command a majority on their own.

Government formation

Notes

References

External links

General
2015 in Spain
2015
December 2015 events in Spain